Lulu is a 1918 Hungarian film directed by Michael Curtiz and featuring Klára Peterdy and Norbert Dan. Some reference sources list Bela Lugosi in the cast, but that is not true.

Cast
 Klára Peterdy
 Norbert Dán

See also
 Michael Curtiz filmography

External links

Films directed by Michael Curtiz
1918 films
Hungarian black-and-white films
Hungarian silent films